Abse is a surname, and may refer to:
 Dannie Abse (1923-2014), Welsh writer and physician
 Joan Abse (1926-2005), English art historian
 Leo Abse (1917-2008), Welsh politician
 Tobias Abse, British historian and professor
 Wilfred Abse (1915-2005), Welsh psychiatrist

Surnames of Welsh origin